Elias Riggs (November 19, 1810 – January 17, 1901) was an American Presbyterian missionary and linguist.

Biography

Elias Riggs was born on November 19, 1810 in New Providence, New Jersey.  He was the second son of Elias and Margaret (Congar) Hudson Riggs. His father was the pastor of the local Presbyterian church. 

During his missionary activities in the Ottoman Empire he contributed greatly to the Bulgarian National Revival.  He organized with Albert Long the first translation (by Neofit Rilski), and worked on editing, printing and dissemination of a translation of the Bible into modern Bulgarian. In 1844 he published the first Grammar of the modern Bulgarian language. Riggs did research on Chaldee Language, and also guided the translation of the Bible into modern Armenian language.

The government and church of newly independent Greece originally opposed Riggs' mission, but later had to accept American and British Protestant activities among Christians other than Greeks.  Riggs took part in negotiations identifying the then actual ethnic delimitation between Greeks and Bulgarians in the Ottoman Empire, resulting in an approximate line drawn between Serres and Edessa in Macedonia north of which the Christian population was recognized as predominantly Bulgarian.  Subsequently, the 1876 Constantinople Conference of the Great Powers confirmed that early delimitation in its more comprehensive definition of ethnic Bulgarian lands as of the late 19th century.

Publications

 Suggested Emendations of the Authorized English Version of the Old Testament (1873)
 Suggested Modifications of the Revised Version of the New Testament
 Some Reasons in Favor of Retouching the Revised English Version of the Scriptures
 Notes on difficult passages of the New Testament
 A Manual of the Chaldee Language

Honour
Riggs Peak on Smith Island, South Shetland Islands is named after Elias Riggs.

References

External links
 Notes on the Grammar of the Bulgarian language - 1844 - Smyrna (now Izmir) - Elias Riggs
 
 
 
 

 
 
 

1810 births
1901 deaths
American Presbyterian missionaries
People from New Providence, New Jersey
Translators of the Bible into Bulgarian
Macedonia under the Ottoman Empire
Ottoman period in the history of Bulgaria
19th-century translators
Presbyterian missionaries in Europe
Protestant missionaries in Bulgaria
Presbyterian missionaries in the Ottoman Empire
American expatriates in the Ottoman Empire
Missionary linguists